Mária Rosza-Urbanik (born 12 February 1967 in Törökszentmiklós, Jász-Nagykun-Szolnok) is a retired female race walker from Hungary. She competed in three consecutive Summer Olympics for her native country, starting in 1992.

Achievements

Awards
 Hungarian athlete of the Year (2): 1993, 1998

References
sports-reference

1967 births
Living people
People from Törökszentmiklós
Hungarian female racewalkers
Athletes (track and field) at the 1992 Summer Olympics
Athletes (track and field) at the 1996 Summer Olympics
Athletes (track and field) at the 2000 Summer Olympics
Olympic athletes of Hungary
Sportspeople from Jász-Nagykun-Szolnok County